Papa Kristo Negovani, born Kristo Harallambi and also known as Kristo Negovani (1875 – 12 February 1905), was an Albanian national figure, priest, poet, teacher, writer and publisher.

Biography
Born as Kristo Harallambi in the village of Negovani, Manastir Vilayet, Ottoman Empire (now in Florina municipality, modern Greece), he became known in his lifetime as Kristo Negovani. He had a brother who was a priest and tended to be pro-Aromanian. His father was a merchant based in Athens, Greece and a young Negovani through a Greek scholarship pursued his secondary schooling in the Greek capital. Negovani's father was killed by bandits in 1891 and he began working as a teacher in Greek schools. 

Later Kristo Negovani emigrated to Brăila, Romania in 1894, joining other fellow migrants from Negovani and he worked as a carpenter. There, he came into contact with the Albanian National Revival movement and attained Albanian national sentiments that developed in tandem with Romanian-Aromanianism. 

In 1897, he returned to his native village and worked as a teacher and later also became a parish priest. Over time, some several thousand people became followers of Negovani. He preformed mass in the Albanian language and taught children in their mother tongue. 

From 1899 onward, Negovani published works in Albanian such as fables and didactic poems, religious instruction texts and articles often composed as sermons in Albanian publications like the almanac Kalendari Kombiar and newspaper Drita. Several notable works in Albanian by Negovani were the History of the Old Testament (1899), a History of the Bible (1903), and the Acts of the Holy Apostles (1906). 

Negovani opposed Greek propaganda and was against marriages with "foreign elements". During 1905, Negovani, in the presence of Bishop Karavangelis conducted the Orthodox Divine Liturgy in the Albanian Tosk dialect. Karavangelis denounced the usage of Albanian in mass and under his orders had Negovani murdered. The village of Negovani was attacked (12 February 1905) by Greek guerillas (andartes) and Kristo Negovani along with his brother and three other villagers were killed. Negovani's death aroused a nationalist response with the Albanian guerilla band of Bajo Topulli killing the Metropolitan of Korçë, Photios.

Works
Negovani is the author of prose and poetry, including school texts, translations and fables. Among his publications are 
The History of the Old Testament,, Bucharest 1889;
The Destruction of Hormova,, Sofia 1904;
Little Dhonat Argjendi, Costanza 1904;
Works of the Holy Apostles, Sofia 1906;
History of Plikati, Thessaloniki 1909.

References

1875 births
1905 deaths
People from Manastir vilayet
Activists of the Albanian National Awakening
Albanian Christians
Albanian Eastern Orthodox priests
19th-century Albanian writers
People murdered in the Ottoman Empire
Assassinated Albanian people
20th-century Albanian writers
Eastern Orthodox writers
20th-century Eastern Orthodox martyrs
People from Perasma
1905 murders in the Ottoman Empire